Buckling is a failure mode characterized by a sudden failure of a structural member subjected to high compressive stresses.

Buckling can also refer to:

 Buckling (fish), a form of smoked herring
 Geometric and Material Buckling in nuclear reactors

See also
 Buckle (disambiguation)
 Sun kink of railway rails